Cox Run is a tributary of Little Muncy Creek in Lycoming County, Pennsylvania, in the United States. Cox Run itself flows through a valley known as Neufer Hollow and is designated as a Coldwater Fishery. A streambank stabilization project along the stream was proposed in 2008.

Course

Cox Run begins in a valley to the east of Buck Hill in Moreland Township. It flows south for a few tenths of a mile before turning south-southwest, still flowing through its valley alongside Buck Hill. The stream then receives an unnamed tributary from the left before turning southwest for more than a mile. In this reach it flows between Buck Hill and Tommy Hill and receives another unnamed tributary from the left, passing through Wolf Township, and entering Muncy Creek Township. It eventually reaches the end of its valley and turns south-southwest, crossing Pennsylvania Route 442. After a few tenths of a mile, the stream reaches its confluence with Little Muncy Creek.

Tributaries
Cox Run has no named tributaries. However, it does have two unnamed tributaries.

Geography and geology
The stream flows through a valley known as Neufer Hollow.

Watershed and biology
The stream is entirely within the United States Geological Survey quadrangle of Hugesville. Its mouth is located within  of Clarketown.

Cox Run is classified as a Coldwater Fishery, like all of the other tributaries of Little Muncy Creek.

History
Cox Run was entered into the Geographic Names Information System on August 2, 1979. Its identifier in the Geographic Names Information System is 1172564.

In 2008, Engineering District 3-0 of the Pennsylvania Department of Transportation applied for permission to carry out a bank stabilization project on Cox Run. The project was intended to have no significant impact on the stream.

See also
Shepman Run, next tributary of Little Muncy Creek going upstream
List of rivers of Pennsylvania

References

Rivers of Lycoming County, Pennsylvania
Tributaries of Muncy Creek
Rivers of Pennsylvania